This is a list of airlines of Nunavut which have an air operator's certificate issued by Transport Canada, the country's civil aviation authority.

Current airlines

Defunct airlines

Other

References

Airlines
Nunavut